Baqerabad-e Tabatabayi (also Romanized as Bāqerābād-e Ţabāṭabāyī; also known as Bāqerābād) is a village in Dowlatabad Rural District, in the Central District of Jiroft County, Kerman Province, Iran. At the 2006 census, its population was 459, in 93 families.

References 

Populated places in Jiroft County